Flybmi, styled as flybmi, legally British Midland Regional Limited and formerly branded as bmi Regional, was a British regional airline that operated scheduled passenger services across the UK and Europe. The head office of the airline was at East Midlands Airport in North West Leicestershire, and it had operating bases at Aberdeen, Brussels, Bristol, East Midlands, Newcastle and Munich.

Flybmi was a former subsidiary of British Midland International (BMI), which was purchased from Lufthansa by International Airlines Group (IAG) on 20 April 2012. Regional was sold to Sector Aviation Holdings in May 2012 and operated as an independent airline from October 2012. In August 2015, the airline became part of a new regional airline group, Airline Investments Limited (AIL), along with Loganair.

Flybmi ceased operations and filed for administration on 16 February 2019.

History

The airline was established in 1987 as Business Air and started operations in August 1987. In 1998 Business Air was purchased by British Midland and became British Midland Commuter. In 2001, it changed its name to bmi regional and later to Flybmi in December 2017.

As a subsidiary of BMI, BMI Regional was owned by Michael Bishop (50%), Lufthansa (30%) and Scandinavian Airlines (20%). Lufthansa purchased Michael Bishop's and SAS' stakes in October 2009, taking full ownership of the airline group. A restructuring of the group was announced the following month, which also affected Regional's operations. A suspension of loss-making routes and capacity adjustments within the group resulted in Regional having a surplus of three Embraer aircraft in 2010, and the company began consultations with staff over possible job losses. The excess aircraft were leased to other carriers.

The airline was acquired by Sector Aviation Holdings, a company predominantly owned and funded by Stephen and Peter Bond, whose family sold helicopter operator Bond Aviation Group in 2010.  Sector Aviation Holdings also included the founders of Regional's predecessor Business Air, Ian Woodley and Graeme Ross. The sale was announced on 1 June 2012.

In 2014 BMI Regional was named the most punctual scheduled airline in the UK for the ninth consecutive year. Based on Civil Aviation Authority statistics, the airline achieved an on-time performance of over 92% in 2013.

On 5 July 2018, BMI Regional rebranded to flybmi.

On the evening of 16 February 2019, Flybmi announced it was to go into administration and would cease operations immediately. All flights were cancelled. 
In the following days, Loganair (also owned by AIL), announced that it was to take over several of Flybmi's routes from Aberdeen and Newcastle. Ryanair offered rescue fares for stranded customers on some routes and also sought to recruit former Flybmi personnel.

Corporate affairs

Offices

At the end of its existence the head office was at Pegasus Business Park on the grounds of East Midlands Airport in Castle Donington.

Since being founded as Business Air, the company had always had its Operations Control Centre located at Aberdeen. The occupied building was shared with CHC Helicopter which utilises the hangar space for helicopter maintenance and storage for its North Sea fleet. Aircraft maintenance is still carried out at the shared hangar, however all other functions have been moved elsewhere.

Following the purchase of Regional in May 2012, Sector Aviation Holdings took the decision to relocate the company headquarters from Aberdeen to Pegasus Business Park, on the grounds of East Midlands Airport.  Whilst a subsidiary, some head office functions were provided by British Midland International at its head office in Donington Hall, Castle Donington.

The registered office was in the Lightyear Building at Glasgow Airport in Paisley, Renfrewshire, Scotland. Previously the registered office was at Aberdeen Airport East in Dyce, Aberdeen, Scotland.

Operations

British Midland Regional Limited held a Civil Aviation Authority Type A Operating Licence, permitting it to carry passengers, cargo and mail on aircraft with 20 or more seats.

After becoming an independent airline, Flybmi changed its callsign from "Kittiwake" to "Midland" and on 28 October 2012 announced that it would be using "BM" as the company IATA airline designator in place of the previously used "BD" which belonged to British Midland International.

The airline's three main operating bases were Aberdeen Airport and Bristol Airport in the UK, as well as Munich Airport in Germany. On 23 January 2014, Flybmi launched a new domestic operation in Norway with an aircraft based in Stavanger. This new service provided the first scheduled direct air link between Harstad/Narvik Airport, Evenes and Stavanger, however this service no longer operates.

Along with the operating bases at the time of closure, Flybmi previously had numerous bases throughout the United Kingdom with crew stationed at Edinburgh Airport, Glasgow Airport, Leeds Bradford Airport, Manchester Airport and London Heathrow Airport. All of these bases had regional routes operated from them along with routes on behalf of British Midland International (BMI), Heathrow which was solely mainline routes.

A base at Birmingham Airport opened during May 2013, but on 28 October 2013 it was announced that following a network review the base would close at the end of December 2013.

Using its Embraer 145 aircraft, Flybmi previously operated a number of shuttle services on behalf of aircraft manufacturer Airbus. These linked manufacturing sites at Broughton, Filton and Toulouse. Despite previously having crew based at Manchester Airport and no scheduled services operating from Chester Hawarden, Flybmi based crew at Hawarden for the Airbus shuttle flights.

Originally the Airbus shuttle operated to Filton Aerodrome but following its closure in December 2012, the shuttle operation transferred to Bristol Lulsgate in January 2013. This had no impact on crew as they were already based at Bristol. The contract for these corporate shuttle flights was won by Eastern Airways and as a result Flybmi ceased operating these flights in late 2015.

In early 2014, Flybmi commenced a contract to operate a further staff shuttle on behalf of helicopter manufacturer AgustaWestland. This shuttle was previously operated by Eastern Airways using an Embraer 135 between Milan Malpensa and RNAS Yeovilton. In 2015 Flybmi chose to operate the route from nearby Bristol Airport instead, thereby enabling them to carry commercial passengers on the route also, as well as upgrading the aircraft type.

In summer 2015 the airline based an Embraer 135 and an Embraer 145 at Munich to operate services to Bern, Liège and Rotterdam in conjunction with Lufthansa and replacing Lufthansa CityLine. This followed the signing of a code-share agreement with Lufthansa in April 2014. During 2015 the service to Liège was cancelled, while a new service to Brno commenced. In early 2016 a further Embraer 145 aircraft was based in Munich in order to allow them to serve further routes from there bringing the total number to eight.

Business figures

Destinations 

As a subsidiary of British Midland International, the airline operated regional services for its parent. After becoming independent of BMI, the airline completed an entire network review which resulted in numerous route and base closures along with the introduction of a number of new routes during 2012 and 2013.

Flybmi operated scheduled services to 23 scheduled destinations throughout continental Europe including Scandinavia and also United Kingdom. Commencing 30 March 2014, the start of the IATA Northern Summer Season 2014, the airline operated a scheduled service on behalf of Brussels Airlines between Brussels and Bristol. Previously, Flybmi also operated a scheduled service on behalf of Brussels Airlines between Brussels and Newcastle.

At the time of closure, Flybmi had codeshare agreements in place with other airlines. Flybmi operated codeshares with Lufthansa on its routes from Bristol to Frankfurt and on all of its routes to/from Munich. It also operated a codeshare with Brussels Airlines from both East Midlands Airport and Newcastle to Brussels.

Flybmi also operated regular holiday charter flights over the summer months. These destinations included Bastia on the island of Corsica on behalf of specialist tour operator Corsican Places, from Bristol, and Verona from Bristol on behalf of another specialist tour operator, Inghams. During 2011 Regional aircraft operated, on behalf of BMI, direct flights between Heathrow Airport and Beja in the Alentejo region of Portugal for Sunvil Discovery.

At the end of July 2016 the airline announced an extension to its codeshare agreement with Brussels Airlines by adding seven new routes to its network. This allowed Flybmi to sell fares to Heathrow Airport.

In 2017 Flybmi operated a short-lived twice-weekly service between Birmingham Airport and Graz, becoming the first and only direct link between the UK and Austria's second city.

Codeshare airlines
As of closure in February 2019, Flybmi codeshared with the following airlines:
 Air Dolomiti
 Air France
 Brussels Airlines
 Loganair
 Lufthansa
 Turkish Airlines

Fleet

Fleet at closure
As of February 2019, the Flybmi fleet consisted of the following aircraft:

15 aircraft were transferred to sister airline Loganair in 2019, while the remaining two were placed into storage.

Planned future fleet
In May 2018 CCO Jochen Schnadt said in an interview with Air Transport World that the carrier was evaluating adding larger regional jets to the fleet with both the Bombardier CRJ900 and Embraer 190 being considered. In June 2018 it was announced that Flybmi would transfer two Embraer ERJ-145 to its sister company Loganair for the start of the S19 schedule.

Former fleet
Flybmi also operated the following aircraft during its existence:
 BAe 146-300
 Saab 340
 Fokker 100

See also
 List of defunct airlines of the United Kingdom

References

Citations

Bibliography

External links 

 
 

Defunct airlines of the United Kingdom
Defunct airlines of Scotland
Airlines established in 1987
Airlines disestablished in 2019
British companies established in 1987
British Midland International
Former Star Alliance affiliate members
Companies based in Leicestershire
Companies that have entered administration in the United Kingdom